Tsvetan Dimitrov (born 10 February 1987) is a Bulgarian footballer, who currently plays as a goalkeeper for Lyubimets 2007.

Career

Chavdar Byala Slatina
During 2006–2007 season, Tsvetan played in B PFG for Chavdar Byala Slatina on loan. On that period he became famous with that he safe a penalty of Bulgarian football star Velizar Dimitrov in 1/16 final for Bulgarian Cup.

Levski Sofia
He comes from Levski Sofia`s Youth Academy. After a short loan to Chavdar Byala Slatina, the head coach of Levski Sofa – Stanimir Stoilov invited the youth keeper and he started trainings with his mother club on 12 November 2007.  He made his redebut for Levski Sofia on 16 November 2007 in a friendly against Vihren Sandanski.
On 3 January 2008 the young goalkeeper signed his first professional contract with Levski for three years.

He became a Champion of Bulgaria in 2009, after a contradictory but great season under the coaching of Emil Velev. Despite the bad results during the autumnal part of the season, after great matches in the spring, Levski Sofia fulfilled the plan before the term had set and became a champion for 26 time, before the last round has been played.

In 2009/2010 season, after couple of bad games and results, Levski however achieved qualifying for UEFA Europa League becoming 3rd in the final ranking.

During the 2010/2011 Levski qualified for UEFA Europa League after eliminating Dundalk F.C., Kalmar FF and AIK Fotboll. Levski was drawn in Group C, facing Gent, Lille and Sporting CP.

Kaliakra Kavarna
On 21 December 2010 Tzvetan signed a 1.5 year contract with the team from Kavarna.

Career Stats
As of 2 September 2010.

Awards
 Champion of Bulgaria 2009 (with PFC Levski Sofia)
 Champion of B PFG 2013 (with Neftochimic Burgas)

External links
 Dimitrov at Levski's site
 Profile at LevskiSofia.info

Bulgarian footballers
1987 births
Living people
First Professional Football League (Bulgaria) players
PFC Levski Sofia players
PFC Kaliakra Kavarna players
Neftochimic Burgas players
FC Lyubimets players
Association football goalkeepers
Footballers from Sofia